Božidar Janković (7 December 1849 – 7 July 1920) was a Serbian army general commander of the Serbian Third Army during the First Balkan War between the Balkan League and the Ottoman Empire. In 1901 he served as Minister of the Army and Navy in the Ministry of Defence.

Biography
He graduated from the Military Academy of the General Staff School. He became State Secretary of Military Matters of Serbia in 1902. As President of the National Defence, he participated in the Chetnik fighting for Macedonia.

In World War I he was the Chief of Staff of the Montenegrin Supreme Command until June 1915 and a delegate of the Serbian Supreme Command at the Montenegrin Supreme Command.

Janković died on 7 July 1920 in the town of Herceg Novi. The town of Elez Han in Kosovo was named 'Đeneral Janković' after him. 
His son Milojko B. Jankovic (1884 - 1973) was the army general in the army of the Kingdom of Yugoslavia.

He was awarded Order of the White Eagle and a number of other decorations.

See also
 Ministry of Defence
 Petar Bojović
 Radomir Putnik
 Živojin Mišić
 Stepa Stepanović
 Ilija Gojković
 Pavle Jurišić Šturm
 Ivan S. Pavlović

References

1849 births
1920 deaths
Military personnel from Belgrade
Serbian soldiers
People of the Serbo-Bulgarian War
Serbian people of World War I
Field marshals
Defence ministers of Serbia